Text figures (also known as non-lining, lowercase, old style, ranging, hanging, medieval, billing, or antique figures or numerals) are numerals designed with varying heights in a fashion that resembles a typical line of running text, hence the name. They are contrasted with lining figures (also called titling or modern figures), which are the same height as upper-case letters. Georgia is an example of a popular typeface that employs text figures by default.

Design 

In text figures, the shape and positioning of the numerals vary as those of lowercase letters do. In the most common scheme, 0, 1, and 2 are of x-height, having neither ascenders nor descenders; 6 and 8 have ascenders; and 3, 4, 5, 7, and 9 have descenders. Other schemes exist; for example, the types cut by the Didot family of punchcutters and typographers in France between the late 18th and early 19th centuries typically had an ascending 3 and 5, a form preserved in some later French typefaces. A few other typefaces used different arrangements. Sometimes the stress of the 0 is made different from a letter o in some way, although many fonts do not do this.

High-quality typesetting generally prefers text figures in body text: they integrate better with lowercase letters and small capitals, unlike runs of lining figures. Lining figures are called for in all-capitals settings (hence the alternative name titling figures), and may work better in tables and spreadsheets. 

Although many traditional fonts included a complete set of each kind of numbers, early digital fonts (except those used by professional printers) included only one or the other. Modern OpenType fonts generally include both, and being able to switch via lnum and onum feature tags. The few common digital fonts that default to using text figures include Candara, Constantia, Corbel, Hoefler Text, Georgia, Junicode, some variations of Garamond (such as the open-source EB Garamond), and FF Scala. Palatino and its clone FPL Neu support both text and lining figures.

History 
As the name medieval numerals implies, text figures have been in use since the Middle Ages, when Arabic numerals reached 12th century Europe, where they eventually supplanted Roman numerals.

Lining figures came out of the new middle-class phenomenon of shopkeepers’ hand-lettered signage. They were introduced to European typography in 1788, when Richard Austin cut a new font for typefounder and publisher John Bell, which included three-quarter height lining figures. They were further developed by 19th-century type designers, and largely displaced text figures in some contexts, such as newspaper and advertising typography. During the period of transition from text figures to lining, a justification for the old system was that the height differences helped distinguish similar numbers, while a justification for lining figures was that they were clearer (being larger) and that they looked better by giving all page numbers the same height. Amusingly, as several later writers have noted, the printer Thomas Curson Hansard in his landmark textbook on printing Typographia describes the new fashion as 'preposterous', but the book was printed using lining figures and the modern typefaces he also criticised throughout.

While always popular with fine printers, text figures became rarer still with the advent of phototypesetting and early digital technologies with limited character sets and no support for alternate characters. Walter Tracy noted that they were avoided by phototypesetting manufacturers since (not being of even height) they could not be miniaturised to form fraction numerals, requiring an additional set of fraction characters. They made a comeback with more advanced digital typesetting systems.

Modern professional digital fonts are almost universally in one or another variant of the OpenType format and encode both text and lining figures as OpenType alternate characters. Text figures are not encoded separately in Unicode, because they are not considered separate characters from lining figures, only a different way of writing the same characters. Adobe's early OpenType fonts used Private Use Area for non-default sets of numerals, but the most recent ones only use OpenType features.

See also 
Arabic numerals

References

Works cited

External links 

 

Typography
Numerals